Dionysius III was the Ecumenical Patriarch of Constantinople from June 29, 1662, to October 21, 1665. He had previously been bishop of Thessaloniki, Larissa (1652–1662) and Bursa.

References

Sources 
 Venance Grumel, Traité d'études byzantines,  « I. La Chronologie », Presses universitaires de France, Paris, 1958.

Bishops of Thessaloniki
Bishops of Larissa
Metropolitans of Bursa
17th-century Ecumenical Patriarchs of Constantinople
People from Andros
17th-century Greek clergy
1696 deaths